Abu Dhabi National Takaful Company PSC -- known simply as Takaful, تكافل, or ADNTC -- was established in 2003 by the Abu Dhabi Islamic Bank (ADIB) and Abu Dhabi Investment Company. It is a powerful player in the UAE takaful market  based in Abu Dhabi, offering a range of takaful products including motor, property, general accidents, family, medical, engineering and Marine cargo coverage.  Its shares are traded on the Abu Dhabi Securities Exchange as TKFL.

In 2014, it underwent a review of its wakala fee structure which improved the balance of earnings between the participant and shareholder funds. In 2015 ADIB became a significant shareholder with a 41.7 percent interest.

Recognition 
The company has won various awards including 'Best Bancatakaful Operator Middle East' at the International Takaful Summit 2012, 'Takaful Operator of the Year' in the Middle East by INSUREX Conference & Awards in 2012 and 2013, and 'Takaful Insurer of the Year' for MENA at the MENA Insurance Review (MENAIR) Insurance Awards 2014.

References

External links
 
 

Takaful companies of the United Arab Emirates
Companies based in Abu Dhabi
Financial services companies established in 2003
Companies listed on the Abu Dhabi Securities Exchange
2003 establishments in the United Arab Emirates
Companies established in 2003